The American Academy Larnaca is a non-profit private school in Larnaca, Cyprus offering pre-school to University entrance education. It is a selective, co-educational, independent school, registered under the Private Schools’ Law, 1971, of the Republic of Cyprus.

The school was founded in 1908. The school motto is "to grow and to serve". It is an extension of the culture and/or ethos of the school referred to as "the Academy spirit" which is characterised by a democratic and positive climate, respect for each other, understanding and co-operation between students and staff as well as student and staff involvement in humanitarian, social, cultural and other activities for the welfare of the people and the community. The school was always a multi-communal school with student enrolment and faculty from Greek Cypriot, Turkish Cypriot, Maronite, Armenian and Latin communities along with foreign nationals. The school participates in the Duke of Edinburgh's Award Scheme.

The school celebrated its  centenary in 2008 with a new negative energy building (a first of its kind on the island) and a series of special events.

History 

The American Academy Larnaca is one of the oldest, still in operation, schools in Cyprus. It was founded in 1908 by two missionaries of the Reformed Presbyterian Church of North America; Rev. McCarroll and Mrs McCarroll who had originally arrived on the island in charge of an elementary mission school. The McCarrolls secured permission to open a secondary school for boys and founded the American Academy Larnaca. Within a year, the school had 60 students enrolled.

The purpose of the Academy was to provide a Christian-focused education which encompassed not only academic training but also a focus on a Christian way of living. Students graduating from the Academy were taught to be tolerant, respectful and to serve the community whilst upholding high ideals and morals.

Although the school was originally intended as a boys’ school, a girls’ department was opened in 1916 using the mission chapel. The initial experiment was short-lived and the girls’ department closed in 1919 but re-opened ten years later. The boy's section continued to grow as did the number of buildings on the present site. During the Second World War, the school was temporarily transferred to the village of Pano Lefkara where it was housed in various buildings between 1941 and 1943.

The present school began to take shape in 1954 with the completion of the Weir Hall and the auditorium added four years later. The original Memorial Hall was pulled down and the New Memorial Hall began to take shape from 1983 onwards.

In 1975 the control of the School and its facilities were handed over to the American Academy Alumni Foundation. Since then, it has operated as a non-profit, secular organisation. School governance is undertaken by 11 elected members and two representatives of the original mission church.

References 

International schools in Cyprus
American international schools in Asia
Larnaca
1908 establishments in Cyprus
Educational institutions established in 1908